Harry J. McIlvenny (5 October 1922 – 29 June 2009) was an English footballer who played as a centre forward.

Career
Born in Bradford, McIlvenny played club football for Yorkshire Amateur, Bradford Park Avenue and Bishop Auckland.

He represented Great Britain at the 1948 Summer Olympics.

Personal life
McIlvenny served in the RAF in World War Two and died in 2009, aged 86.

References

1922 births
2009 deaths
English footballers
Yorkshire Amateur A.F.C. players
Bradford (Park Avenue) A.F.C. players
Bishop Auckland F.C. players
English Football League players
Footballers at the 1948 Summer Olympics
Olympic footballers of Great Britain
People educated at Ashville College
Sportspeople from Yorkshire
Association football forwards